Bruce James Evans (21 January 1925 – 8 November 2012) was an Australian politician.

He was born in Bairnsdale to Joseph Evans, a farmer, and Daisy Shankly, a schoolteacher. He attended local state schools and became a bank officer for the Union Bank in 1941. In 1943 he enlisted with the Royal Australian Air Force and went on to serve in South Africa, the United Kingdom and the Middle East as a wireless air gunner. On his return in 1946 he took up dairy farming at Lindenow, and became branch president of the Returned and Services League (1947–49, 1956–57). He was active in the local dairy farming community and also in the Country Party, serving as a national, branch and district secretary. In 1961 he was elected to the Victorian Legislative Assembly as the member for Gippsland East. He was the party's deputy leader from 1964 to 1970 and its whip from 1970 until his retirement in 1992.

References

1925 births
2012 deaths
National Party of Australia members of the Parliament of Victoria
Members of the Victorian Legislative Assembly
Royal Australian Air Force personnel of World War II
Royal Australian Air Force airmen
Military personnel from Victoria (Australia)